The  (AVG, AVg, Aka, AV; English: Academic publishing company) in Leipzig was an important German academic publisher, which was founded in 1906.

The original Jewish owners of the publishing house and key employees were expropriated during the time of the Nazi regime, emigrated and founded new scientific publishing houses in other countries. The publishing house was then named .

After World War II, in the German Democratic Republic (GDR/DDR) the Leipzig branch of the publishing house was transformed into  in 1947 and 1951. This was dissolved in 1991 as a consequence of the German reunification.

Between 1953 and 1983, another  seeing itself as the legal successor of the original company existed in the Federal Republic of Germany (FRG/BRD) in Frankfurt am Main and Wiesbaden.

History 
 founded an antiquarian bookshop in Leipzig in 1879. Leo Salomon Jolowicz (born 12 August 1868 in Posen; died 7 June 1940 in Leipzig) took over the bookshop in 1898 and turned it into the largest and best-known scientific antiquarian bookshop in Germany.

A decade after being founded, the antiquarian bookshop Fock had already opened department stores in New York and San Francisco, later also in Tokyo. In 1991, the renowned Buchhandlung Mayer & Müller in Berlin, who also had a scientific program and distributed many American scientific journals, was added to the portfolio. The C. F. Winter'sche Verlagshandlung in Leipzig followed in 1923.

Among many others, the list of authors included Wilhelm Ostwald (i.e. , since 1918), Svante Arrhenius (1906), Pierre Curie and Marie Curie, William Ramsay, Arnold Sommerfeld (Lectures on theoretical physics) und Hendrik Antoon Lorentz. From 1921,  also published a well-known series of new editions of scientific classics  (taken over from Verlag Wilhelm Engelmann in 1919). The successors of the publishing house in West and East Germany continued this tradition. For the most part Jolowicz published natural sciences, medicine and mathematics, but also Hebraica and Judaica.

Leo Jolowicz's son-in-law Kurt Jacoby (born 1893 in Insterburg; died August 1968 in New York) was also involved in the expansion of the publishing house. In 1930, Jolowicz's son Walter Jolowicz (1908–1996, who later called himself Walter J. Johnson after emigrating to the USA) joined the business as well.

In the early 1930s the publishing house published 26 journals. Some 70% of the revenue were generated in foreign markets, which helped to solidify the business despite decreasing profits. In 1933,  had a revenue of 1 million Reichsmark and a profit of 337,000 Reichsmark.

When the National Socialists came to power, the publishing house was "aryanized" (Jolowicz was a Jew) and Jolowicz was gradually pushed out of the business. In 1937, he finally left the publishing house. He applied for emigration in 1939, but was unable to leave Germany and died in 1940, possibly by suicide.

His son Walter and his son-in-law Kurt Jacoby were sent to a concentration camp in 1938, but were then able to leave Germany and emigrated via Russia, Japan and other countries to New York, USA, where they arrived in 1941 and 1942, respectively, and founded the publishing house Academic Press. Other emigrants like  and former members of  like Erich Simon Proskauer (1903–1991) had already founded  in New York in 1940. The Dutch  (1913–1995), who had absolved his training at  since 1934, joined the new publishing house  (later part of Elsevier) in 1936 to build it up following 's model.

Johannes Geest and Felix Portig followed Jolowicz as publishing directors. In 1940, however, their names were soon replaced by Walter Becker and Willy Erler in the commercial register.

The book inventory of Gustav Fock GmbH burned down in a bomb attack on Leipzig on 4 December 1943.

After Portig's death in January 1953 and the "" of Lotze, the majority of the shares in the KG were taken over by the state. In 1959, these were transferred to VEB Gustav Fischer Verlag.

Together, they continued to publish  and the series of biographies of important scientists.

The remaining heiress Gertrud Margarete Portig was pushed out of the company entirely by 1972 when the publishing house became the property of VEB Gustav Fischer Verlag.

Newly founded in December 1953 as a consequence of East-Germany's occupation of the publishing house in Leipzig, there was another  in Frankfurt am Main aiming as the original publisher's successor in West Germany. It was later situated in Wiesbaden and since 1975 owned by the publisher family Steiner. It existed until 1983.

After the German reunification, the East-German  fell to the Treuhandanstalt, which closed the publishing house in 1991.

Other publishers 

(The Wiebelsheim publisher must not be confused with the unrelated namesake  in Graz, Austria, an extreme right publisher.)

In 1996, the  aka  was founded. This publisher claims to continue the tradition of the former  as well.

See also 

Notes

References

Further reading 
  (230 pages, blue linen)
  (5 pages)
 
  (155 pages) (NB. On Leo Jolowicz.)
  (184 pages, blue linen)
 
  (124 pages) (NB. On Leo Jolowicz.)

External links 
 Uns eint die Liebe zum Buch. Jüdische Verleger in Leipzig 1815–1938 Video about exhibition in 2021 [25:46]

Volkseigene Betriebe
Academic publishing companies
Educational book publishing companies
Publishing companies of Germany
Book publishing companies of Germany
Publishing companies established in 1906
Publishing companies disestablished in 1991